Jacob Emil "Dick" van Hoogstraten (1898–1991) was a Dutch public servant in the Dutch East Indies from 1922 to 1949, functioning as Director of the Department of Economic Affairs from 1942 to 1949. He was one of the architects of economic recovery from the economic crisis of the early 1930s and the economic set-back of the Japanese occupation during the early 1940s in Indonesia.

Origin in the Netherlands 
Van Hoogstraten was born in Eerbeek on 26 March 1898. The ancestry of the Van Hoogstraten family reaches back to the 16th century. His father, Gerard van Hoogstraten (1870-1920), was a parson in the Dutch reformed church in Eerbeek. His mother, Amanda Augusta Schoch (1869-1951), was an editor and author of women's novels and other publications of a Christian-philosophical nature. Van Hoogstraten attended primary school and high school in nearby Apeldoorn.

He graduated from his undergraduate law studies at the University of Utrecht in 1920. As was common at the time, Van Hoogstraten later that year completed graduate studies with a Doctorate of Law after defending propositions at the same university. After completing his military service, he was appointed to a position in the public service in colonial Indonesia in July 1922. Before his departure to Indonesia, he married Johanna Wilhelmina ('Angy') Sanders (1900-1958) on 19 September 1922 in Lausanne (Switzerland).

Colonial public service, 1920s 
Late in 1922, Van Hoogstraten started his employment at the General Secretary in Buitenzorg (now Bogor), in the service of the Governor General. In Buitenzorg, Van Hoogstraten and his wife had four children: Gheret Samuel (1923-2008), Susanne Marianne (born in 1924), Jean Gustave Ulric (1927-1990) and Dirk Hans (1933-2002).

He also served in the Regency Council of Buitenzorg advising the indigenous regents (bupati) from 1925 to 1928 and again from 1933 to 1935. He briefly worked at the Department of Education and Religion during the first half of 1927. As was usual in colonial Indonesia, after 6 years of public service Van Hoogstraten was granted 8 months furlough in 1928. The family left in November 1928 and spent an expended leave period in Lausanne, returning to Indonesia in March 1930.

Upon his return in April 1930, Van Hoogstraten re-joined the General Secretary He was soon appointed as secretary of a committee that had to investigate news agency Aneta and later as head of the section for government publications. The committee substantiated allegations expressed in parliament about lack of subjectivity in Aneta's press releases and the agency's misuse of its near-monopoly on facilitating access to news in colonial Indonesia. It is not clear what Van Hoogstraten's contribution to the work of the committee was, but it may have been exceptional because he was appointed Knight in the Order of the Netherlands Lion in August 1931 He then also became secretary of the Council of Department Directors in December 1931.

A religious man 
Van Hoogstraten was a religious man and occupied social positions related to his faith. For example, during 1926–1928, he was Secretary of the private Committee for the Separation of Church and State (Commissie voor de Scheiding van Kerk en Staat). In the 1930s he was an elder in the Dutch reformed church in Bogor, and chaired the Bogor chapter of the Christian Constitutional Party (Christelijke Staatkundige Partij, CSP). As church elder, he participated in a proto-synod in April 1933. which established the foundations for the reorganisation of the Dutch reformed church in Indonesia. He also participated as speaker in several religion-related events of e.g. the Salvation Army and CSP in Jakarta, offered public speeches on topics like the separation of church and state, became a member of the governing board of the Dutch reformed church, and of the inaugural board of the theological high school in Bogor for the training of missionaries.

During economic crisis and recovery, 1933-1941 
In addition to being secretary of Council of Department Directors, Van Hoogstraten became secretary of the council's sub-committee for economic issues in August 1933. From then on, until 1950, his professional life became very time-absorbing. As secretary of the latter sub-committee, he attracted the attention of the new Department of Economic Affairs that was established in 1934 with Edmund P. Wellenstein as Director. In May 1934 he joined this Department as head of the section for foreign trade policy. He was immediately attached to the Dutch delegation to the eventually inconclusive Hart-Nagaoka bilateral trade negotiations with Japan that took place in Bogor during September–December 1934. From April 1935, Van Hoogstraten also doubled as head of the section for economic crisis measures.

From May 1934, his professional duties multiplied quickly, and his religion-related social activities decreased. The main reason for Van Hoogstraten's increased work load was the fact that Indonesia suffered badly from the global economic crisis. Import restrictions imposed by trade partners caused significant surpluses of sugar, rubber, tea and other commodities, while the massive growth of imports of Japanese textiles replaced imports from the Netherlands and local production. His Department used government intervention in order to combat the crisis through the licensing of production capacity, and an intricate system of import quota to minimise imports by protecting and encouraging domestic production of manufactures and staple foods, particularly rice.

Indonesia's import restrictions became increasingly detailed and also subject to regular negotiations with the Netherlands and with existing and potential trade partners such as India and Thailand (March 1936), Japan and China (May 1937) and Australia (November 1941). Van Hoogstraten participated or led delegations to these countries to discuss trade opportunities, bilateral trade concessions, as well as shipping connections. In addition, domestic import controls required regular consultations with local importers, such as with rice importers in Medan to explain the government's ban on rice imports in May 1937. Import concessions granted by trade partners for particular agricultural commodities required controls over exports, as well as production and prices, through cooperation with several newly established semi-private associations of producers and exporters.

Nevertheless, after a further 6 years of public service, Van Hoogstraten was granted furlough during April–October 1936. Presumably he went to join his wife who had already left for the Netherlands in October 1935 with their two youngest children.

Upon his return to Indonesia, and still only in his late-30s, Van Hoogstraten was one of the senior officials in the Department of Economic Affairs in colonial Indonesia. When in 1937 Hubertus J. van Mook became Director, both of them worked closely together on shaping and implementing Indonesia's trade policies, to the extent that Van Hoogstraten became van Mook's Deputy in the process. It is likely that their collaboration was based on a shared belief that the future of Indonesia would be best-served if the Netherlands would grant it a higher degree of self-governance.

Together, van Mook and Van Hoogstraten led the difficult further trade negotiations with Japanese representatives in respectively 1938 and 1940–1941. They also faced the difficulty that the Netherlands had little to offer Indonesia by way of securing international export markets. It largely fell to Van Hoogstraten to negotiate the principles and details of Dutch-Indonesian economic cooperation with the Dutch government during 1939–1940. This involved walking a tightrope between the interests of the Netherlands in foreign trade, and particularly in Indonesia's foreign currency earnings, and those of colonial Indonesia.

During the Japanese occupation of Indonesia, 1942-1945 
When the Dutch government appointed van Mook as Lt Governor General in January 1942, Van Hoogstraten became Director of Economic Affairs. Together with van Mook, he flew to Australia on 7 March 1942, just prior to the fall of Java to the Japanese. A month later, van Mook was called to London to become Minister of Colonial Affairs in the Dutch government in exile in addition to being Lt Governor General. He left Van Hoogstraten in charge of organising the Netherlands East Indies Commission for Australia and New Zealand. This was effectively the Netherlands Indies government in exile, located in Melbourne (Australia). It worked with the Australian government to prepare for the return to Indonesia after the war.

As Minister, van Mook abolished the Commission in July 1944 and instead created several government departments, putting Van Hoogstraten in charge of the positions of Director of Economic Affairs and acting General Secretary of the Council of Department Heads (Raad van Departementshoofden), effectively the government in exile of colonial Indonesia. It worked with the US Allied Supreme Commander of the South West Pacific Area, General Douglas MacArthur, and set out to build the Netherlands Indies Civil Administration (Nederlandsch-Indische Civiele Administratie, NICA), a public service that would be ready to move to Indonesia to assume civil administration after the war. Following van Mook's return to Australia in September 1944, the colonial government in exile moved to Brisbane, where it worked to prepare for the return of the colonial government to Indonesia after the Japanese surrender and the necessary relief and recovery activities.

During the decolonisation of Indonesia, 1945-1949 
At the time of Japan's surrender, Van Hoogstraten was in the Netherlands, which had been liberated a few months earlier. He left immediately on 17 August to return to Indonesia. Back in Jakarta in September and with NICA support, he took charge as Director of Economic Affairs of recovering the facilities of his Department and preparing policies for the postwar economic recovery of Indonesia. One of the Department's first measures was to take control and monopolise foreign trade through the Netherlands Indies Common Import and Export Organisation (Nederlandsch-Indische Gemeenschappijke Import en Export Organisatie), which had been established in Melbourne in 1944 to license all foreign trade and allow the colonial government to allocate foreign exchange earnings to crucial imports.

Subsequently, Van Hoogstraten became involved in negotiating Indonesia's independence as a federal republic, which led to the completion of the Treaty of Linggarjati in November 1946. In the process of both negotiations and planning economic recovery, he had regular contact with his counterpart in the government of the Republic of Indonesia, Adnan Kapau ('A.K.') Gani, during 1946 and particularly in April–May 1947. Van Hoogstraten negotiated further details with Gani following the ratification of the Linggarjati agreement in March 1947. But his duties included many other tasks, such as representing the economic interests of Indonesia in the United States and the Netherlands.

Following the creation of the Provisional Federal Council of Indonesia in January 1948, the Council of Department Heads became the Provisional Federal Government of Indonesia in March 1948, in which Van Hoogstraten was State Secretary for Economic Affairs. With the process towards independence apparently in place, he turned his attention to the urgent issue of foreign exchange shortages and planning for Indonesia's economic future, including reviving the industrialisation plans that the Department of Economic Affairs had created in 1941. A year later Van Hoogstraten was a member of the delegation of the provisional government that negotiated the independence of Indonesia with the Republic of Indonesia during the Round Table Conference in September–October 1949. His contribution focused on the discussions in the economic and financial committee, particularly the issue of bilateral financial transfers between Indonesia and the Netherlands.

Public service in colonial Indonesia 1933-1949 
During 1933–1949, Van Hoogstraten's life appears to have been fully absorbed by his professional duties in the public service of the Netherlands Indies and Indonesia. He never reflected in public speeches or published interviews in any detail on what motivated him, but he appears to have dealt with a multitude of issues in a very pragmatic way. In the 1930s he seems to have been driven by a pragmatic understanding that colonial Indonesia needed a greater degree of political autonomy. He sustained this during the 1940s, seemingly concluding in 1946 – like van Mook – that Indonesia's independence was inevitable, and participating in the negotiations leading to the Linggarjati Agreement in 1946 and the Round Table Conference in 1949. At the same time, he initiated policies for the rehabilitation and recovery of Indonesia's economy during 1945–1949.

Personal life 
His dedication to his professional duties during these intense years took a personal toll, as Van Hoogstraten's marriage did not survive. He probably separated from his wife in August 1939, when she returned to The Netherlands with their two youngest children. The family disintegrated further when Van Hoogstraten most likely had to leave his two eldest children in Indonesia in March 1942, where they must have been interned by the Japanese until September 1945. Van Hoogstraten and his wife divorced on 25 March 1947 in The Hague. A month later, on 26 April 1947 during a visit to Australia, he married Lucy Bell Donaldson (1907-1987) in Melbourne. She was the daughter of Major Robert J. Donaldson DSO, Vice-Consul of the Netherlands in Queensland, and worked for the Netherlands Indies government in Melbourne.

After public service, 1950s 
Following the transfer of sovereignty over Indonesia in December 1949, Van Hoogstraten returned to civilian life. From 1950 until his retirement in late-1958 at the age of 60, he was employed by the Foundation for the Representation in Indonesia of the Netherlands Manufacturing Industry (Stichting Vertegenwoordiging in Indonesië van de Nederlandse Industrie). Based in Jakarta, he traveled the region as the general representative of the foundation for the Far East, Australia and New Zealand.

Awards 
The Dutch government appointed Van Hoogstraten Ridder in de Orde van de Nederlandse Leeuw in 1931 and Officier in de Orde van Oranje-Nassau in 1938. The French government made him an Officer in the Orde de l’Étoile Noire in 1933 and the Chinese government awarded him the Order of Brilliant Jade in 1938 and made him Commander in the Order of Brilliant Jade the next year.

After retirement, he returned to the Netherlands and settled in The Hague, where he lived for over 30 years until his death on 17 March 1991.

References

1898 births
1991 deaths
Dutch civil servants
20th-century Dutch East Indies people
People from Brummen
Utrecht University alumni
Knights of the Order of the Netherlands Lion
Officers of the Order of Orange-Nassau